X to Y is a 2009 short film written and directed by Matt Sobel and starring Brett Lee Alexander, Madison Nicole Alexander, Shivani Kadakia, and Tony Panighetti. It was shot on location in White Sands, New Mexico.

Cast
Brett Lee Alexander as Toby
Madison Nicole Alexander as Skittle
Shivani Ray as Priya
Tony Panighetti as Neil

Awards
The film's festival debut was at Cinequest Film Festival 19 on March 6, 2009, where it won the Audience Award for best short film.

References

External links
 

2009 films
American short films
2000s English-language films